Lady in the Lake is a 1947 American film noir

Lady in the Lake may also refer to:

 The Lady in the Lake, a 1943 Raymond Chandler novel; basis for the film
 "A Lady in the Lake", a 1985 episode of Murder She Wrote
 "The Lady in the Lake" (Agent Carter), a 2016 television episode
 Lady in the Lake trial, a 2005 British murder case
 "Wasdale Lady in the Lake", a name given to British murder victim Margaret Hogg in 1984 before her remains were identified

See also
Lady of the Lake (disambiguation)
Lady of the Lake, a character in the Arthurian legend
Lady in the Water, a 2006 film by M. Night Shyamalan